Agonopterix leptopa is a moth in the family Depressariidae. It was described by Alexey Diakonoff in 1952. It is found in China (northern Yunnan) and north-eastern Myanmar.

References

Moths described in 1952
Agonopterix
Moths of Asia